Russian Orthodox Cathedral of the Transfiguration of Our Lord is a historic Russian Orthodox cathedral at 228 North 12th Street in the Williamsburg neighborhood of Brooklyn, New York City.  The cathedral was designated a New York City landmark by the Landmarks Preservation Commission in 1969, and was listed on the National Register of Historic Places in 1980.

History and description
The cathedral was built from 1916 to 1921 and was designed by Louis Allmendiger.  The plan is based on a Greek cross and is designed in the Russian version of the Byzantine style, but with a Renaissance flavor. The building features characteristic copper Onion domes atop four octagonal belfries and a large central copper-covered dome. Each  dome is topped by a large, gilded Russian Orthodox cross.

The building's facade is constructed from yellow bricks with a small amount of trim made from stone. The windows and doors are primarily round-arched, with stairs leading to the front entrance.

In popular culture
Exterior shots of the cathedral were used in the Seinfeld episode "The Conversion" where it represented a fictionalized version of a Latvian Orthodox church.

See also
List of New York City Designated Landmarks in Brooklyn
National Register of Historic Places listings in Kings County, New York

References

External links

Official website

Churches in Brooklyn
Cathedrals in New York City
Russian Orthodox cathedrals in the United States
New York City Designated Landmarks in Brooklyn
Russian Orthodox church buildings in the United States
Churches completed in 1921
20th-century Eastern Orthodox church buildings
Church buildings with domes
Properties of religious function on the National Register of Historic Places in Brooklyn
Byzantine Revival architecture in New York City
Russian-American culture in New York City
Eastern Orthodox churches in New York City
20th-century churches in the United States